Jacob "Jake" Horgan (born April 7, 2000) is a Canadian curler, originally from Sudbury, Ontario. He currently plays second on Team Tanner Horgan. He is a seven-time Northern Ontario junior champion.

Career

Juniors
As a bantam-aged curler, Horgan won three Northern Ontario titles (2010, 2013, and 2015). In 2012, he won the Ontario provincial elementary school championship, representing MacLeod Public School. Playing for his brother Tanner, Horgan won six straight Northern Ontario Junior Men's Championships from 2014 to 2019. They proved to be a strong team on the national stage as they won silver medals in 2016 and 2018 and a bronze medal in 2017. Jacob won his first junior provincial title as a skip in 2020 and skipped his team to a 3–6 record at the 2020 Canadian Junior Curling Championships.

Men's
In 2016, Team Horgan competed in their first Grand Slam of Curling event at the 2016 Boost National as the sponsor's exemption. They finished with a 1–3 record, defeating Steve Laycock in their final round robin match.

Personal life
Horgan is currently a business administration student at Laurentian University, and a customer service representative at Greater Sudbury Utilities. He has a boyfriend Owen. His siblings Tracy Fleury, Jennifer Wylie and Tanner Horgan are also accomplished curlers.

Teams

References

External links

2000 births
Living people
Canadian male curlers
Curlers from Northern Ontario
Sportspeople from Greater Sudbury
Laurentian University alumni
Sportspeople from Kingston, Ontario
Canadian LGBT sportspeople
LGBT curlers